The Aro-Ibibio Wars were a series of conflicts between the Aro people (subgroup of the Igbo) and a Ibibio in present-day Southeastern Nigeria at Ibom Kingdom from 1630 to 1902. These wars led to the foundation of the Arochukwu kingdom.

The Arochukwu conquest 
For about a thousand years, the Ibibios had established Ibom Kingdom in the area which later became Arochukwu. They founded several states (Ibom Kingdom and Nsit Ibom) and had a strong cultural presence. The Eze Agwu clan from Abiriba, initiated Igbo migration into the region around the mid-17th century. The Ibibio clan welcomed all until some started rebelling against the ruling house. The Eze Awgu group who lead the rebellion against the ruling family aligned with several outside forces like the Priest Nnachi from the Edda group near Afikpo, was called by their king Awgu Inobia (Eze Agwu) for help. When he arrived, Nnachi and Eze Agwu allied with prince Akakpokpo Okon of the Ibibio kingdom of Ibom Kingdom. Akakpokpo Okon was the son of a marriage between an Igbo women of the Eze Agwu clan and the King Obong Okon Ita in an attempt of a peace treaty for a war that have been fought between the Igbo subgroup and Ibibio. The Eze Agwu/Nnachi faction decided to help Akakpokpo attempt to overthrow his brother king Akpan Okon.

The coup was heavily resisted which called for even more help. Through Nnachi, an Eastern Cross river group answered the call for help. They were known as the Akpa who were living at today Akwa Akpa before the arrival of the Efik people in that region. These warriors and traders, may have had European guns which were new to the territory. Being the Igbo allies, the Akpas were led by the royal Nnubi family. Osim and Akuma Nnubi led Akpa soldiers to help fight against the ruling household. Together with Igbo forces and  rebels, they defeated the Ibom Kingdom forces (1690). During the final battles, Osim Nnubi was slain in Oror city state making it the capital of Arochukwu. In Obinkita the remaining Ibibio warriors became prisoners and were judged and that is why the city state is the holder of the Ikeji festival. But at the end of the war, Osim and  Akakpokpo were dead. In order to honor Osim's legacy, his brother Akuma was crowned the first EzeAro (king). After his death, Nnachi's descendants took the throne starting with his first son Oke Nnachi. The Arochukwu kingdom, was founded.

Aftermath 
After Arochukwu was formed, it began to expand because of the growing population and territorial protection. Ibibio groups who were kicked out and their allies (Obot Mme, Mako, etc.) sporadically attacked Arochukwu shortly after its formation. In order to neutralize Ibibio invasions, Aro forces formed vigilante camps which eventually grew into communities on the Arochukwu-Ibibio boundaries and repelled the invasions.

See also 
Arochukwu
Aro Confederacy
Akpa
Aro history

External links 
http://www.aro-okigbo.com/history_of_the_aros.htm
http://www.aronetwork.org/others/arohistory.htmlhttp://www.aronewsonline.com/origincivilization.html
http://people.bu.edu/manfredi/Contours.pdf
https://web.archive.org/web/20110209213030/http://anny-nigeria.com/
https://books.google.com/books?id=tjLjoC6ScKYC&pg=PA26&lpg=PA26&dq=aro+slave+trade+ohafia+ibibio&source=bl&ots=vsWGxqbRH4&sig=rI60QzRMmm2rUFU7ki-ibbRCyYE&hl=en&ei=4_nxTIysFIGglAen54i2Cg&sa=X&oi=book_result&ct=result&resnum=2&ved=0CB0Q6AEwATgK#v=onepage&q=aro%20slave%20trade%20ohafia%20ibibio&f=false

References 

Aros
Ibibio
Wars involving the Aro Confederacy
Wars involving Igboland
History of Nigeria
17th century in Nigeria
18th century in Nigeria